Daryan (also Romanized as Dāryān, Daryān, Dāreyān, Daryon, Dārīān, and Dārīyān) is a village in Guney-ye Markazi Rural District of the Central District of Shabestar County, East Azerbaijan province, Iran. At the 2006 National Census, its population was 2,220 in 691 households. The following census in 2011 counted 3,954 people in 1,207 households. The latest census in 2016 showed a population of 4,138 people in 1,242 households; it was the largest village in its rural district. The main source of income for families is agriculture and farming.

Points of interest 
 Yas Darreh: This is one of the beautiful palaces with a small lake and a small fountain.  
 Sultan Abad: A very small village nearby full of almond trees.

References 

Shabestar County

Populated places in East Azerbaijan Province

Populated places in Shabestar County